During the 1993–94 English football season, Barnet F.C. competed in the Football League Second Division.

Squad

Season summary
In the 1993–94 season, Barnet goalkeeper Gary Phillips took over as manager during a difficult summer in which the club marginally survived a vote of expulsion by a Football League EGM, and lost the vast majority of their promotion winning side in a tribunal which nullified the players' contracts. Phillips cobbled together a squad from the few remaining players and free transfers. In January 1994 Phillips was assisted by former England goalkeeper Ray Clemence, but were still relegated from Division Two.

Final league table

Results
Barnet's score comes first

Legend

Football League Second Division

FA Cup

League Cup

Football League Trophy

References

Barnet F.C. seasons
Barnet